Ugunja town is a market town in western Kenya, located in Ugunja Division, Siaya County. It has a population of approximately 17,000 and is rapidly growing. Ugunja Division had a population of 79,113 according to the 1999 Kenyan census. Most of the inhabitants in Ugunja are Luos.

Ugunja is located on the Kisumu-Busia highway, which links Kenya and Uganda. Ugunja town is 72 km north of the nearest city, Kisumu, which sits on the shores of Lake Victoria. The equator is 40 km south of Ugunja town.

Rural residents of Ugunja mainly depend on agriculture as their main source of food and income. The area receives two rainy seasons a year: March to June and September to December. The farming is mostly subsistence based, and major crops grown are sorghum, potatoes, cassava, beans, and maize. When farmers have surplus crops, they sell in local markets for income. In the past some farmers have grown cotton and coffee as cash crops, but due to market unreliability most farmers now prefer to grow food crops for their own families and local markets.

Ugunja town serves as a trading center for the community around it and the nearby urban centers. In the town most people work in small businesses and offices. There are a number of retail shops, bars, hotels, cafes, and residential houses. Also in the area are a bank, a post office, transport service companies, supermarkets, chemists, three health centers, dispensaries, and some private clinics. Ugunja town is also the location of the Ugunja Community Resource Centre.

External links

About Ugunja and District
All About Ugunja

Siaya County
Populated places in Nyanza Province